Louis 19, King of the Airwaves is a Canadian comedy film, released in April 1994.

The film stars Martin Drainville as Louis Jobin, a television fanatic who wins a contest to be on television. Unbeknownst to him, however, his prize is to become a reality show: he is followed around by a cameraman 24 hours a day for three months, and when his life doesn't make for compelling viewing, the show's producers decide to manipulate his life to make the show more exciting.

The film was directed by Michel Poulette, and written by Poulette, Sylvie Bouchard, Michel Michaud and Émile Gaudreault. It won the Golden Reel Award as the year's top-grossing film in Canada.

Cast
 Martin Drainville : Louis Jobin
 Zenhu Han : Sam Ying
 Chantal Fontaine : la reporter
 Gilbert Lachance : Remi
 Jean L'Italien : Roger
 Dominique Michel : Aline Jobin
 Alexandra Boulianne : une chanteuse de la chorale
 Mireille Thibault : une chanteuse de la chorale
 Sylvie Bouchard : une chanteuse de la chorale
 Yves Jacques : Michel Gobeil
 Carol Jones : une gardienne de sécurité
 Patricia Tulasne : Charlotte Dubreuil
 Marcela Seguel : Marie-Laurence Despins
 Stephanie Laplante : scripte télé
 Pierre Paquin : réalisateur télé
 Guillaume Lemay-Thivierge : le technicien de la régie
 Agathe de La Fontaine : Julie Leduc
 Marie-Claude Robitaille: Guylaine
 Sonia Laplante: Josée
 Benoît Brière: Caméraman

Release
The film opened on 34 screens in Quebec on April 1, 1994.

Reception
The film grossed $194,732 in its opening weekend It went on to win the Golden Reel Award for the year's top-grossing film in Canada, even though it was only released in Quebec, with a gross of C$1.8 million.

Awards
The film won the Claude Jutra Award for the best feature film by a first-time Canadian film director. It was also a nominee for Best Motion Picture, but lost to Exotica.

Remake
The 1999 American film EDtv was an adaptation of Louis 19.

References

External links
 

1994 films
Canadian comedy films
Best First Feature Genie and Canadian Screen Award-winning films
Canadian satirical films
Films directed by Michel Poulette
Films about television
1994 directorial debut films
French-language Canadian films
1990s Canadian films